Sherrod Malone (Sherry) Smith (February 18, 1891 – September 12, 1949) was a starting pitcher in Major League Baseball. From 1911 until 1927, he pitched for the Pittsburgh Pirates (1911–12), Brooklyn Robins (1915–17, 1919–1922) and Cleveland Indians (1922–1927). Smith batted right-handed and threw left-handed. He was born in Monticello, Georgia.

Smith was the hard-luck loser of one of the longest World Series games ever played. He pitched all the way into the 14th inning for Brooklyn, dueling with Boston's starting pitcher, Babe Ruth, in Game 2 of the 1916 World Series until the Red Sox won it 2-1. It would be his only appearance in that Series.

He made two strong starts in the 1920 World Series. Smith was the winning pitcher of Game 3 against Cleveland, throwing a three-hitter in a 2-1 victory. But despite another impressive effort in Game 6, he lost a 1-0 duel with Duster Mails, and Brooklyn ended up losing that Series in seven games.

Placed on waivers after the 1922 season, Smith was claimed by Cleveland and pitched there for several seasons. He led all American League pitchers in 1925 in complete games with 22, also leading the league that season in walks and hits allowed.

In a 14-season career, Smith posted a 114–118 record with 428 strikeouts and a 3.32 ERA in 2,052.2 innings pitched.

Smith was a good hitting pitcher in his major league career. He posted a .233 batting average (165-for-709) with 59 runs, 6 home runs and 60 RBI. He was used as a pinch-hitter five times in his career.

Smith died in Reidsville, Georgia, at age 58.

References

External links
 or Baseball Library

1891 births
1949 deaths
People from Monticello, Georgia
Sportspeople from the Atlanta metropolitan area
Brooklyn Robins players
Cleveland Indians players
Pittsburgh Pirates players
Major League Baseball pitchers
Baseball players from Georgia (U.S. state)
Minor league baseball managers
Greensboro Champs players
Jacksonville Jays players
Greenwood Scouts players
Springfield Reapers players
Louisville Colonels (minor league) players
Grand Rapids Bill-eds players
Newark Indians players
People from Reidsville, Georgia
Cedartown Cedars players